Park In Won (born October 9, 1936)  was the third mayor of Mungyeong City, in North Gyeongsang province, South Korea.  He is an independent, without formal affiliation to any political party.  He was elected to the post on June 13, 2002, and completed his term in June 2006.

Park received his elementary schooling in Mungyeong, at Jeomchon's Hoseonam Elementary School, but completed his subsequent education in Daegu.  He graduated from high school in 1955, and acquired a diploma in law at Dankook University in 1957.  Subsequently, he worked as a venture capitalist.

External links
English-language website of the Mungyeong Mayor's office

Mungyeong
South Korean businesspeople
Living people
1936 births
Mayors of places in South Korea